Brown's Ferry Park in South Carolina was a park on Old Brown's Ferry Road in Georgetown County, South Carolina.  The park, which was located adjacent to the Black River, was closed in 2008.

References

Parks in South Carolina
Geography of Georgetown County, South Carolina